Siederia alpicolella is a moth of the Psychidae family. It is found in France, Austria, Switzerland and Slovenia.

The wingspan  is 14–15 mm. The forewings are shining brownish-grey with white markings. The hindwings are grey.

References

Moths described in 1919
Psychidae